Dimitrios Boukis (born 18 December 1963) is a Greek former sailor. He competed at the 1992 Summer Olympics, the 1996 Summer Olympics, and the 2000 Summer Olympics.

References

External links
 
 

1963 births
Living people
Greek male sailors (sport)
Olympic sailors of Greece
Sailors at the 1992 Summer Olympics – Star
Sailors at the 1996 Summer Olympics – Star
Sailors at the 2000 Summer Olympics – Star
Sailors (sport) from Athens